The following lists events that happened during 1897 in New Zealand.

Incumbents

Regal and viceregal
Head of State – Queen Victoria
Governor – The term of David Boyle, 7th Earl of Glasgow as Governor ends on 8 February. He is succeeded on 9 August by Sir Uchter John Mark Knox, 5th Earl of Ranfurly

Government and law
The 13th New Zealand Parliament continues with the Liberal Party in power.

Speaker of the House – Sir Maurice O'Rorke
Prime Minister – Richard Seddon
Minister of Finance – Richard Seddon
Chief Justice – Hon Sir James Prendergast

Opposition Leaders

See: :Category:Parliament of New Zealand, :New Zealand elections

Main centre leaders
Mayor of Auckland – Abraham Boardman followed by Peter Dignan
Mayor of Christchurch – Harry Joseph Beswick followed by Walter Cooper
Mayor of Dunedin – Hugh Gourley followed by Edward Bowes Cargill
Mayor of Wellington – Francis Bell

Events 
 3 May: Margaret Cruickshank becomes New Zealand's first registered woman doctor.
 14 May: Pigeon post is introduced between Auckland and Great Barrier Island.

Arts and literature

Music

Sport

Athletics
National Champions, Men
Arthur Holder is the first athlete to win four titles at a single championships (he is also second in the 100 yards).

100 yards – Alfred J. Patrick (Wellington)
250 yards – Arthur H. Holder (Wanganui)
440 yards – Arthur H. Holder (Wanganui)
880 yards – James McKean (Auckland)
1 mile – James McKean (Auckland)
3 miles – E. Reynolds (Auckland)
120 yards hurdles – Arthur H. Holder (Wanganui)
440 yards hurdles – Arthur H. Holder (Wanganui)
Long jump – Leonard Cuff (Canterbury)
High jump – C. Laurie (Auckland)
Pole vault – tie Jimmy Te Paa (Auckland) and Hori Eruera (Auckland)
Shot put – Timothy B. O’Connor (Auckland)
Hammer throw – J. Callender (Auckland)

Chess
National Champion: R.J. Barnes of Wellington.

Cricket

Golf
The National amateur championships were held in Auckland
 Men – D. Pryde (Hutt)
 Women – L. Wilford (Hutt)

Horse racing

Harness racing
 Auckland Trotting Cup (over 2 miles) is won by Awahuri

Thoroughbred racing
 New Zealand Cup – Waiuku
 New Zealand Derby – Multiform
 Auckland Cup – Antares
 Wellington Cup – Strath Braan

Season leaders (1896/97)
Top New Zealand stakes earner – Multiform
Leading flat jockey – R. Derrett

Lawn Bowls
National Champions
Singles – W. McLaren (Kaitangata)
Pairs – W. Cowie and W. Thomson (skip) (Dunedin)
Fours – H. Nalder, W. Thomas, R. Struthers and H. Thomson (skip) (Christchurch)

Polo
Savile Cup winners – Manawatu

Rowing
National Champions (Men)
Single sculls – C. Chapman (Wairewa)
Double sculls – Wairewa, Little River
Coxless pairs – Picton
Coxed fours – Queen's Dr, Port Chalmers

Rugby union
 1897 New Zealand rugby union tour of Australia
Provincial club rugby champions include: 
see also :Category:Rugby union in New Zealand

Shooting
Ballinger Belt – Private A. Ballinger (Wellington Guards)

Soccer
Provincial league champions:
	Auckland:	Auckland United
	Otago:	Roslyn Dunedin
	Wellington:	Wellington Swifts

Swimming
National Champions (Men)
100 yards freestyle – T. Wauchop (Canterbury)
220 yards freestyle – W. Stratton (Canterbury)

Tennis
National Championships
Men's singles – J. Marshall
Women's singles – Kathleen Nunneley
Men's doubles – H. Parker and C. Gore
Women's doubles – Kathleen Nunneley and T. Trimmell

Births

 28 January: Howard Kippenberger, soldier.
 23 March: Leslie Andrew, soldier.
 10 August: Maurice Brownlie, rugby union player.
 2 December: Rewi Alley, writer, educator, friend of China.
 3 December: John Buckland Wright, engraver and book illustrator.

Deaths
 22 April: Charles John Taylor, politician (in England).
 21 May: Abraham Boardman, Mayor of Auckland.
 23 September: Henry Fish, politician 
 27 September: John Lillie Gillies, politician.
 Mary Anne Rymill, missionary, teacher, nurse and companion (born 1817).

See also
List of years in New Zealand
Timeline of New Zealand history
History of New Zealand
Military history of New Zealand
Timeline of the New Zealand environment
Timeline of New Zealand's links with Antarctica

References
General
 Romanos, J. (2001) New Zealand Sporting Records and Lists. Auckland: Hodder Moa Beckett. 
Specific

External links